The pore space of soil contains the liquid and gas phases of soil, i.e., everything but the solid phase that contains mainly minerals of varying sizes as well as organic compounds.

In order to understand porosity better a series of equations have been used to express the quantitative interactions between the three phases of soil.

Macropores or fractures play a major role in infiltration rates in many soils as well as preferential flow patterns, hydraulic conductivity and evapotranspiration. Cracks are also very influential in gas exchange, influencing respiration within soils. Modeling cracks therefore helps understand how these processes work and what the effects of changes in soil cracking such as compaction, can have on these processes.

The pore space of soil may contain the habitat of plants (rhizosphere) and microorganisms.

Background

Bulk density

The bulk density of soil depends greatly on the mineral make up of soil and the degree of compaction. The density of quartz is around 2.65 g/cm3 but the bulk density of a soil may be less than half that density.

Most soils have a bulk density between 1.0 and 1.6 g/cm3 but organic soil and some friable clay may have a bulk density well below 1 g/cm3.

Core samples are taken by driving a metal core into the earth at the desired depth and soil horizon. 
The samples are then oven dried and weighed.

Bulk density = (mass of oven dry soil)/volume

The bulk density of soil is inversely related to the porosity of the same soil. The more pore space in a soil the lower the value for bulk density.

Porosity

 or 

Porosity is a measure of the total pore space in the soil. This is measured as a volume or percent. The amount of porosity in a soil depends on the minerals that make up the soil and the amount of sorting that occurs within the soil structure. For example, a sandy soil will have larger porosity than silty sand, because the silt will fill in the gaps between the sand particles.

Pore space relations

Hydraulic conductivity
Hydraulic conductivity (K) is a property of soil that describes the ease with which water can move through pore spaces. It depends on the permeability of the material (pores, compaction) and on the degree of saturation. Saturated hydraulic conductivity, Ksat, describes water movement through saturated media. Where hydraulic conductivity has the capability to be measured at any state. It can be estimated by numerous kinds of equipment. To calculate hydraulic conductivity, Darcy's law is used. The manipulation of the law depends on the soil saturation and instrument used.

Infiltration
Infiltration is the process by which water on the ground surface enters the soil. The water enters the soil through the pores by the forces of gravity and capillary action. The largest cracks and pores offer a great reservoir for the initial flush of water. This allows a rapid infiltration. The smaller pores take longer to fill and rely on capillary forces as well as gravity. The smaller pores have a slower infiltration as the soil becomes more saturated.

Pore types
A pore is not simply a void in the solid structure of soil. The various pore size categories have different characteristics and contribute different attributes to soils depending on the number and frequency of each type. A widely used classification of pore size is that of Brewer (1964):

Macropore
The pores that are too large to have any significant capillary force. Unless impeded, water will drain from these pores, and they are generally air-filled at field capacity. Macropores can be caused by cracking, division of peds and aggregates, as well as plant roots, and zoological exploration. Size >75 μm.

Mesopore
The largest pores filled with water at field capacity. Also known as storage pores because of the ability to store water useful to plants. They do not have capillary forces too great so that the water does not become limiting to the plants. The properties of mesopores are highly studied by soil scientists because of their impact on agriculture and irrigation. Size 30–75 μm.

Micropore
These are "pores that are sufficiently small that water within these pores is considered immobile, but available for plant extraction." Because there is little movement of water in these pores, solute movement is mainly by the process of diffusion. Size 5–30 μm.

Ultramicropore
These pores are suitable for habitation by microorganisms. Their distribution is determined by soil texture and soil organic matter, and they are not greatly affected by compaction Size 0.1–5 μm.

Cryptopore
Pores that are too small to be penetrated by most microorganisms. Organic matter in these pores is therefore protected from microbial decomposition. They are filled with water unless the soil is very dry, but little of this water is available to plants, and water movement is very slow. Size <0.1 μm.

Modeling methods
Basic crack modeling has been undertaken for many years by simple observations and measurements of crack size, distribution, continuity and depth. These observations have either been surface observation or done on profiles in pits. Hand tracing and measurement of crack patterns on paper was one method used prior to advances in modern technology. Another field method was with the use of string and a semicircle of wire. The semi circle was moved along alternating sides of a string line. The cracks within the semicircle were measured for width, length and depth using a ruler. The crack distribution was calculated using the principle of Buffon's needle.

Disc permeameter
This method relies on the fact that crack sizes have a range of different water potentials. At zero water potential at the soil surface an estimate of saturated hydraulic conductivity is produced, with all pores filled with water. As the potential is decreased progressively larger cracks drain. By measuring at the hydraulic conductivity at a range of negative potentials, the pore size distribution can be determined. While this is not a physical model of the cracks, it does give an indication to the sizes of pores within the soil.

Horgan and Young model
Horgan and Young (2000) produced a computer model to create a two-dimensional prediction of surface crack formation. It used the fact that once cracks come within a certain distance of one another they tend to be attracted to each other. Cracks also tend to turn within a particular range of angles and at some stage a surface aggregate gets to a size that no more cracking will occur. These are often characteristic of a soil and can therefore be measured in the field and used in the model. However it was not able to predict the points at which cracking starts and although random in the formation of crack pattern, in many ways, cracking of soil is often not random, but follows lines of weaknesses.

Araldite-impregnation imaging
A large core sample is collected. This is then impregnated with araldite and a fluorescent resin. The core is then cut back using a grinding implement, very gradually (~1 mm per time), and at every interval the surface of the core sample is digitally imaged. The images are then loaded into a computer where they can be analysed. Depth, continuity, surface area and a number of other measurements can then be made on the cracks within the soil.

Electrical resistivity imaging
Using the infinite resistivity of air, the air spaces within a soil can be mapped. A specially designed resistivity meter had improved the meter-soil contact and therefore the area of the reading.
This technology can be used to produce images that can be analysed for a range of cracking properties.

See also

Aeration of soil
Particle density
Pore water pressure
Soil respiration

References

Further reading

Foth, H.D.; (1990) Fundamentals of soil science. (Wiley: New York)
Harpstead, M.I.; (2001) Soil science simplified. (Iowa State University Press: Ames)
Hillel, D.; (2004) Introduction to environmental soil physics. (Sydney : Elsevier/Academic Press: Amsterdam ;)
Kohnke, H.; (1995) Soil science simplified. (Waveland Press: Prospect Heights, Illinois)
Leeper GW (1993) Soil science : an introduction. (Melbourne University Press: Carlton, Victoria.)

Soil science
Soil mechanics
Porous media